Varqeh may refer to:
 Varqeh-ye Olya
 Varqeh Rural District